The 1946 United States Senate election in Texas was held on November 5, 1946. Incumbent Democratic U.S. Senator Tom Connally was re-elected to his fourth term in office, with only minor opposition in the Democratic primary and general elections.

Democratic primary

Candidates
Tom Connally, incumbent U.S. Senator since 1929
Arlon Barton Davis, perennial candidate and son of former U.S. Representative James "Cyclone" Davis
Floyd E. Ryan
Terrell Sledge
Charles L. Somerville

Results

General election

Results

See also 
 1946 United States Senate elections

References

Texas
1946
Senate